The 2018 Polish Super Cup was the 28th Polish Super Cup, an annual Polish football match played between the reigning winners of the Ekstraklasa and Polish Cup. It was held on 14 July 2018 between the 2017–18 Ekstraklasa and 2017–18 Polish Cup winners Legia Warsaw and the 2017–18 Polish Cup runners-up Arka Gdynia at Legia's home, the Stadion Wojska Polskiego in Warsaw. Arka played its second Super Cup match, while Legia played its 13th and sixth consecutive Super Cup. It was a rematch of the previous Super Cup edition, during which Arka ended their first Super Cup appearance with a victory.

Arka won 3–2 to retain their Super Cup trophy, while Legia lost the Super Cup match for the sixth consecutive time.

Match

See also
2017–18 Ekstraklasa
2017–18 Polish Cup

References

SuperCup
Polish Super Cup
Polish SuperCup
Sports competitions in Warsaw